Caouette is a surname. Notable people with the surname include:

Armand Caouette (1945–2010), Canadian politician
Catherine Aurelia Caouette (1833-1905), Canadian nun
Gilles Caouette (1940–2009), Canadian politician
Jonathan Caouette (born 1973), American film director
Réal Caouette (1917–1976), Canadian politician